The 1900 United States presidential election in Oregon took place on November 6, 1900. All contemporary 45 states were part of the 1900 United States presidential election. Oregon voters chose four electors to the Electoral College, which selected the president and vice president.

A return to prosperity, continued American expansion in the Philippines, and the fading of the Populist revolt that had spread into Southern Oregon during the previous decade ensured that incumbent President William McKinley would not have any trouble carrying the state.

Indeed, the Populist voters during the 1890s from southern and Eastern Oregon – who had been historically Democratic since before statehood when they were substantially settled by southerners from the Ozarks and Appalachia – turned in substantial numbers to McKinley, so that Jackson County and also Umatilla County voted for a Republican presidential candidate for the first time ever and Josephine County for only the second after 1888. These results were also replicated in lower-level elections, so that at state level Oregon would remain, with a very brief New Deal interlude, a one-party state dominated by the Republican Party until the “Revolution of 1954”. Consequently, this would prove the last time until Franklin D. Roosevelt’s 1932 landslide that any Democrat other than Woodrow Wilson carried any of Oregon's counties in a Presidential election.

Bryan had previously lost Oregon to McKinley four years earlier and would later lose the state again a third time in 1908 to William Howard Taft.

Results

Results by county

See also
 United States presidential elections in Oregon

Notes

References

Oregon
1900
1900 Oregon elections